O. Madhavan (1922 – 19 August 2005) was an Indian theatre director and actor. He was one of the founding members of the Communist Party of India in Kerala. He is considered one of the great masters of the theatre; he has made major contributions for the evolution of theatre in Kerala. He was the founder of the renowned drama company Kalidasa Kala Kendram. He won the Kerala State Film Award for Best Actor in 2000 for his role in the film Sayahnam

Early life and family
His wife, Vijayakumari, is an actress herself and his son Mukesh is an actor. He also has two daughters, Sandhya Rajendran and Jayasree Syamlal. Sandhya's husband, E. A. Rajendran is also an actor. He has 5 grandchildren, Shravan Mukesh, Thejas Mukesh, Divya Darshan R. Engoor, Neetha Syam and Nathalia Syam.  .

Awards
1982: Kerala Sangeetha Nataka Akademi Award
1996: Kerala Sangeetha Nataka Akademi Fellowship
2000: Kerala State Film Award for Best Actor - Sayahnam

Filmography
 Kalam Marunnu (1955)
 Viyarppinte Vila (1962)
 Doctor (1963)
 Kattupookkal (1965) .... Lonachan
 Oru Sundariyude Kadha (1972)
 Sayahnam (2000)

References

External links

"Actor O. Madhavan passes away". The Hindu
Madhavan at MSI

20th-century Indian film directors
1922 births
2005 deaths
Communist Party of India politicians from Kerala
Male actors from Kerala
Kerala State Film Award winners
People from Kollam district
Sree Narayana College, Kollam alumni
Male actors in Malayalam cinema
Indian male film actors
Indian male stage actors
20th-century Indian male actors
Indian actor-politicians
Film directors from Kerala
Recipients of the Kerala Sangeetha Nataka Akademi Fellowship
Recipients of the Kerala Sangeetha Nataka Akademi Award